The National Youth Committee of IMRO – Bulgarian National Movement political party was established in the autumn of 2001 in the city of Troyan in order for all the youth organizations in the country to be united. Since 2004, the National Youth Committee is the official national youth organization of IMRO – Bulgarian National Movement.

See also 
 “IMRO – Bulgarian National Movement” political party

References

External links 
 Website of “IMRO – Bulgarian National Movement” political party 
 Website of the National Youth Committee of “IMRO – Bulgarian National Movement” political party

Politics of Bulgaria
Youth wings of political parties in Bulgaria
Internal Macedonian Revolutionary Organization